Tadeusz "Thaddeus" F. Zielinski (191611 Aug 1990) was a bishop of the Polish National Catholic Church (PNCC). Zielinski was born in Wilkes-Barre, Pennsylvania in 1916 to Francis and Mary Kompinski Zielinski. He was consecrated in Buffalo, New York on September 2, 1954 and served as Prime Bishop of the Polish National Catholic Church from 1969 until his retirement in 1978. Zielinski was the first American to serve as a Bishop in the PNCC, and likewise, was the first bishop primate born in the United States. Zielinski died on August 11, 1990, at the age of 85 in Scranton, Pennsylvania. During his tenure, the use of the English language, in place of Polish, was popularized with the translation of liturgies and hymns.

References 

American bishops
Bishops of the Polish National Catholic Church
Prime Bishops of the Polish National Catholic Church
American people of Polish descent
1916 births
1991 deaths
20th-century American clergy